Elnur Mammadli (born 29 June 1988, Baku, Azerbaijan SSR, Soviet Union) is an Azerbaijani judoka.

He won the gold medal during the 2008 Beijing Olympics in the -73 kg division. In the final he beat the favorite Wang Ki-Chun.  Wang had suffered a ribcage fracture when Brazil's Leandro Guilheiro hit him with an elbow in the quarterfinal.

Achievements

References

External links

 
 Videos of Elnur Mammadli (judovision.org)

1986 births
Living people
Azerbaijani male judoka
Judoka at the 2008 Summer Olympics
Judoka at the 2012 Summer Olympics
Olympic judoka of Azerbaijan
Olympic gold medalists for Azerbaijan
Olympic medalists in judo
Sportspeople from Baku
Medalists at the 2008 Summer Olympics
21st-century Azerbaijani people
20th-century Azerbaijani people